A detailed discography of releases by the hardcore punk musician and spoken word artist Jello Biafra:

Releases with the Dead Kennedys

Studio albums
Fresh Fruit for Rotting Vegetables - September 1980
Plastic Surgery Disasters - November 1982
Frankenchrist - October 1985
Bedtime for Democracy - November 1986

Live albums
A Skateboard Party - August 1983
Mutiny on the Bay - February 2001
Live at the Deaf Club - March 2004

Compilation albums
Give Me Convenience or Give Me Death - June 1987
Milking the Sacred Cow - October 2007

EPs
In God We Trust, Inc. - December 1981

Singles
"California über alles" - June 1979
"Holiday in Cambodia" - May 1980
"Kill the Poor" - October 1980
"Too Drunk to Fuck" - May 1981
"Nazi Punks Fuck Off!" - November 1981
"Bleed for Me" - July 1982
"Halloween" - December 1982

Videos
The Early Years Live - July 1987
The Lost Tapes - July 2003
DMPO's on Broadway - February 2004

Albums with The Witch Trials
The Witch Trials - 1980, with Adrian Borland, Morgan Fisher, Christian Lunch and East Bay Ray

Albums with Lard
The Power of Lard - 1989
The Last Temptation of Reid - 1990
Pure Chewing Satisfaction - 1997
70's Rock Must Die - 2000

Albums with the No WTO Combo
Live from the Battle in Seattle - 1999

Spoken word

Albums
No More Cocoons - 1987
High Priest of Harmful Matter − Tales From the Trial - 1989
I Blow Minds for a Living - 1991
Beyond the Valley of the Gift Police - 1994
If Evolution Is Outlawed, Only Outlaws Will Evolve - 1998
Become the Media - 2000
The Big Ka-Boom, Pt. 1 - 2002
Machine Gun in the Clown's Hand - 2002
In the Grip of Official Treason - 2006

EPs
Die for Oil Sucker/Pledge of Allegiance - 1991

Singles
"The Green Wedge" - 2000

Collaborations
"How Do You Spell Relief?" by Bank of Sodom (Vocals: Jello Biafra, Drums: David Licht, Other instruments: Kramer [David Licht and Kramer are both from Shockabilly]) on The End of Music (As We Know It) (1988)
Last Scream of the Missing Neighbors (1989), with D.O.A.
Supernaut EP (1990), with 1000 Homo DJs (credited as Count Ringworm)
The Sky is Falling and I Want My Mommy (1991), with NoMeansNo
Tumor Circus (1991), with Steel Pole Bathtub
"Will the Fetus Be Aborted?" single (1993), with Mojo Nixon with the Toadliquors
Prairie Home Invasion (1994), with Mojo Nixon with the Toadliquors
"Raza Odiada (Pito Wilson)" (1995), with Brujeria (band)
Never Breathe What You Can't See (2004), with The Melvins (credited as Osama McDonald)
Sieg Howdy! (2005), with The Melvins
"Jezebel" single (2008), with Brown Town West
"Average Men" (2009), with Pansy Division
"Punch", by Motorpsycho featuring Jello Biafra, on All Sewn Up - A Tribute To Patrik Fitzgerald (2009)
Walk on Jindal's Splinters (2015), with The Raunch and Soul All-Stars

Jello Biafra and the Guantanamo School of Medicine
 The Audacity of Hype (2009)
 Enhanced Methods of Questioning (2011)
 White People and the Damage Done (2013)
 Tea Party Revenge Porn (2020)

Compilation albums
Terminal City Ricochet Soundtrack (1989)
The Bat Bites Back (1994) — "Love Me, I'm a Liberal" by Jello Biafra & Mojo Nixon with the Toadliquors (Phil Ochs cover)
Less Rock, More Talk: A Spoken Word Compilation (2000)
Apocalypse Always (2002)
Mob Action Against The State (2002)
Green Revolution - A Good Planet is Hard To Find (2002)
Dropping Food On Their Heads is Not Enough: Benefit For RAWA (2002)
Hardcore Breakout USA 1,2,3,... (2004)
Rock Against Bush, Vol. 1 (2004)
Radio 1190: The Local Shakedown Volume 2 (2004)
Hardcore Breakout - Essential Punk (2012)

Guest appearances
The Iceberg/Freedom of Speech...Just Watch What You Say (1989) by Ice-T — spoken word sampled on "Shut Up, Be Happy" and "Freedom Of Speech"
Double Happiness (1991) by John + Julie — spoken word sampled on "Double Happiness (Shut Up - Be Happy!)"
Body Count (1992) by Body Count — spoken word sampled on "Freedom Of Speech"
Chaos A.D. (1993) by Sepultura — co-writing and vocals on "Biotech is Godzilla"
Human = Garbage (1994) by Dystopia — spoken word contributions on "Sanctity"
Notes From Thee Underground (1994) by Pigface — contributions to "Hagseed"
Helter Skelter (1996) by The D.O.C. — spoken word sampled on "Secret Plan"
Ixnay on the Hombre (1997) by The Offspring — spoken word parts for "Disclaimer"
Just Trip (1997) by Life After Life — vocals on "Still Is Still Moving To Me"
Let Us Play! (1997) by Coldcut — vocals on "Every Home a Prison"
Deviant (2000) by Pitchshifter — spoken word parts for "As Seen on T.V."
America's Sweetheart (2000) by Spit
Nation (2001) by Sepultura — vocals on "Politricks"
Tool - Parabola- Commentary on video on DVD single.
War (If It Feels Good, Do It) (2004) by various artists — spoken word sampled on "Nobody Cares (Die For Oil Sucker)" by the DJs of Mass Destruction
Hardcore Breakout USA 1,2,3,... (2004) by Various, vocals on JFA "Clown Part"
The Code Is Red...Long Live the Code (2005) by Napalm Death — vocals on "The Great and the Good"
Broker's Banquet (2005) by The Yuppie Pricks — vocals on "Damn, It Feels Good To Be A Yuppie"
Rio Grande Blood (2006) by Ministry — vocals on "Ass Clown"
Cocked and Loaded (2006) by Revolting Cocks — lead vocals on "Dead End Streets" and "Viagra Culture"
Liberty Toast (2006) by Disaster Strikes — backing vocals on "Mission Accomplished"
J'Irai Chier dans ton Vomi (2006) by Métal Urbain — producer and vocals in ""
Grand 'ol Party Crash (2006) by Cage
Pick a Bigger Weapon (2006) by The Coup — spoken word on "Two Enthusiastic Thumbs Down"
Children of the Secret State (2006) by Throw Rag
Pandelirium (2006) by Th' Legendary Shack Shakers — vocals on "Ichabod!" and "No Such Thing"
Blowfly's Punk Rock Party (2006) by Blowfly — vocals on "R. Kelly in Cambodia"
Deadline (2007) by Leftöver Crack and Citizen Fish — spoken word parts for "Baby-Punchers"
Everybody Make Some Noise! (2008) by The A.K.A.s (Are Everywhere!) — spoken word on "Deaf Before Dishonor"
Rocky Mountain Low: The Colorado Musical Underground Of The 1970s (2009) by various artists — vocals with The Healers on "School Bus", "Cruisin", "Obey the Law", and "California über alles"
Surgical Meth Machine (2016) by Surgical Meth Machine — vocals on "I Don't Wanna"

Biafra, Jello
Discographies of American artists